James Gregory Shaw (born March 21, 1957) is an American lawyer and an associate justice of the Alabama Supreme Court.  He is a member of the Republican Party.  He was elected in 2008 to the seat of retiring Justice Harold See.  He was sworn into office in 2009. He was re-elected in 2014.  Prior to his election to the Supreme Court he served on the Alabama Court of Criminal Appeals from 2001 to 2009. He is married to former Alabama State Auditor Samantha Shaw.

He has a Bachelor of Science degree from Auburn University and a Juris Doctor from Cumberland School of Law and a Master of Laws from the University of Virginia School of Law.  Earlier in his career he worked for two other members of the Alabama Supreme Court, serving as Staff Attorney for Justice Janie L. Shores in 1984 and then joining the staff of Justice Gorman Houston in 1985.

References

External links

1957 births
Living people
Methodists from Alabama
Alabama Republicans
Politicians from Birmingham, Alabama
Justices of the Supreme Court of Alabama
Spouses of Alabama politicians
Auburn University alumni
Cumberland School of Law alumni
20th-century American lawyers
21st-century American judges